The 2007 British Indoor Athletics Championships was the 1st edition of the national championship in indoor track and field for the United Kingdom, organised by UK Athletics. It replaced the AAA Indoor Championships run by the Amateur Athletic Association of England, which had been the de facto national indoor championship since 1935. It was held from 10–11 February at the English Institute of Sport, Sheffield, England. A total of 24 events (divided evenly between the sexes) were contested over the two-day competition.

Medal summary

Men

Women

References 

2007 British Indoor Championships . UKAthletics. Retrieved 2020-01-25.
Norwich Union European Indoor Trials. Power of 10. Retrieved 2020-01-25.

British Indoor Championships
British Indoor Athletics Championships
Sports competitions in Sheffield
Athletics Indoor
Athletics competitions in England
February 2007 sports events in the United Kingdom